The Chesapeake and Ohio class M-1 was a fleet of three steam turbine locomotives built by the Baldwin Locomotive Works for the Chesapeake and Ohio Railway in 1947–1948 for service on the Chessie streamliner. As diesel locomotives became more prevalent following World War II, the C&O was one of several railroads that were reluctant to abandon coal as a fuel source, and saw steam turbine technology as a possible alternative to diesel. At the time of its construction it was the longest single-unit locomotive in the world.

Design 
The design of the M-1 was a collaboration between the C&O, the Baldwin Locomotive Works and Westinghouse. The C&O possessed substantial coal-hauling revenue and was loath to abandon it as a fuel source. Further, C&O's engineering staff expressed concern that oil reserves would be exhausted within 25-30 years. The locomotive contained a single Westinghouse turbine which in turn drove four direct current (DC) generators, mounted in pairs. Each generator produced , and the four generators collectively turned eight traction motors.

Defying the usual convention, the M-1 was arranged with its boiler in the rear and the coal bunker in the front. The turbine-generator system meant that the M-1 contained no cylinders. The reduced number of moving parts meant that, in theory, the M1 required far less maintenance than a conventional steam locomotive. Its designers predicted that it could make a round trip between Washington and Cincinnati without servicing.

The locomotive's throttle included eleven settings, ranging from one (idling) to eleven (full speed). Not including research and development, the three locomotives cost .

Career 
The C&O cancelled the Chessie in 1948, before it ran in revenue service, depriving the M-1s of their reason for existence. The M-1s themselves proved expensive to operate and mechanically unreliable. They spent their short careers operating between Clifton Forge and Charlottesville, Virginia. The locomotives were scrapped in 1950.

See also 
 GE steam turbine locomotives
Chesapeake and Ohio 490

References

External links 

 Steam C&O Historical Society: Locomotives

Experimental locomotives
Steam turbine locomotives
M1
Baldwin locomotives
Railway locomotives introduced in 1947
Steam locomotives of the United States
2-C1+2-C1-B locomotives
Scrapped locomotives
Standard gauge locomotives of the United States
Passenger locomotives